The Night Watchmen is an Australian sports television show broadcast on Fox Cricket on Friday or Saturday nights at the conclusion of the nights Big Bash League fixture. The show is co-hosted by James "The Professor" Rochford and Andrew "Barney" Barnett, who are each week joined by a cricket personality. The show takes a satirical look at controversies and issues in cricket.

The show is a spin-off of the Fox League program Narrow World of Sports that airs throughout the NRL season.

In an Instagram post published on 11 December 2020, host James Rochford confirmed that the show wouldn't air as planned for the 2020-21 season, as COVID-19 restrictions prevented studio audiences attending the recordings.

Presenters

Current
 James "The Professor" Rochford (co-host, 2018–present)
 Andrew "Barney" Barnett (co-host, 2018–present)
 Nick Rado (Nick's News, 2019–present)

Past
 Sam Taunton (Innovation Station, 2018–2019)
 Kath Loughnan ('lady with the news', 2018–2019)

History
The show was officially announced as part of the 2018-19 Fox Cricket line-up of programming at the launch of the channel on 9 October 2018. The show premiered on Friday 21 December 2018 at approximately 10.30pm following the Sydney Thunder vs Melbourne Stars Big Bash League fixture.

Series overview
{| class="wikitable plainrowheaders" style="text-align:center;"
|-
! scope="col" style="padding: 0 8px;" colspan="2" rowspan="2"| Season
! scope="col" style="padding: 0 8px;" rowspan="2"| Episodes
! scope="col" colspan="3"| Originally aired
|-
! scope="col" style="padding: 0 8px;"| First aired
! scope="col" style="padding: 0 8px;"| Last aired
|-
| scope="row" style="background:skyblue;"|
| 1
| 9
| style="padding: 0 8px;"| 
| style="padding: 0 8px;"| 
|-
| scope="row" style="background:#71BC78;"|
| 2
| 8
| style="padding: 0 8px;"| 
| style="padding: 0 8px;"| 
|}

Episodes

Season 1 (2018-19)

Season 2 (2019-20)

See also

 List of Australian television series

References

External links
 
 

2010s Australian television series
English-language television shows
Australian sports television series
Fox Sports (Australian TV network) original programming
Cricket on television